Place names considered unusual can include those which are also offensive words, inadvertently humorous or highly charged words, as well as place names of unorthodox spelling and pronunciation, including especially short or long names. These names often have an unintended effect or double-meaning when read by someone who speaks another language.

Profane, humorous, and highly charged words

A number of settlements have names that are offensive or humorous in other languages, such as Rottenegg or Fucking (renamed to Fugging in 2021) in Austria, or Fjuckby in Sweden, where the name can be associated with the word "fuck". Although as a place name Fucking is benign in German, in English the word is usually vulgar. Similarly, when they hear of the French town of Condom, English speakers will likely associate it with condoms. Hel, Poland is a Polish seaside resort on the Hel Peninsula, while Hell, Norway, comes from the old Norse word hellir, which means "overhang" or "cliff cave". In modern Norwegian, the word  means "hell", while the Norwegian word hell can mean "luck".

Conversely, a number of place names can be considered humorous or offensive by their inhabitants, such as the Italian town of Bastardo ("Bastard") and Troia ("Slut", literally the female of the pig; the same name is used in Italian for the ancient city of Troy), the German towns Affendorf ("Monkey Village"), Bösgesäß ("Bad-ass" or "Evil- Buttlock"), Faulebutter ("Rancid Butter"), Fickmühlen ("Fuck Mills"), Himmelreich ("Kingdom of Heaven"), which appropriately lies at the edge of the Höllental ("Hell's Valley"), Katzenhirn ("Cat Brain", nearest to Mindelheim), Lederhose (Lederhosen, leather trousers), Neger ("Negro"), Plöd ( means "stupid", renamed in 2009), Regenmantel ("Raincoat"), Morgenröte-Rautenkranz ("Morning glory rhombus wreath"), and Warzen ("Warts"), or the Swedish villages of "Porrarp" (in which "porr" translates to "porn"), "Mensträsk ("Menstruation lake"), "Fittja" ("Fitta" translates to "cunt"), and "Rövhålet" ("Asshole"). The Austrian municipality Unterstinkenbrunn and the cadastral community Oberstinkenbrunn ("Lower Stinking Well" and "Upper Stinking Well", respectively) can also be considered offensive by residents. In the Czech Republic, there are villages called Šukačka ("Fucking") and Onen Svět ("The Other World"), which are located 2 kilometres from each other. In Hong Kong, place names containing the words "shi" (屎 - shit) and "niu" (尿 - piss) are common, and there are a number of place names actually containing profanities along the coast such as Gau Tau (lit. penis head), Ham Lun Kok (含倫角 - lit. "oral sex corner" which the character 倫 is a substitute of the profanity word 𡳞 meaning dick) which the common name has since been changed to Shek Ngau Chau (石牛洲) and Yau Lung Kok (游龍角) respectively. The name Kau Shi Wai (狗屎圍 in Cantonese - in which 狗屎 means "dog shit") was changed as it was indecent and could cause embarrassment. In the US, the name of the town of Effingham, Illinois contains a minced oath for "fuck".

Batman is a city in eastern Turkey with an indigenous name identical to the modern comic book character. Across the border in Azerbaijan lies the city of Ganja with a name identical to English language slang for cannabis.

Some place names are deemed to be offensive or unacceptable, often through historic semantic changes in what is tolerated.

An example of this would be the once common English street name Gropecunt Lane, whose etymology is a historical use of the street by prostitutes to ply their trade. During the Middle Ages the word cunt may often have been considered merely vulgar, having been in common use in its anatomical sense since at least the 13th century. Its steady disappearance from the English vernacular may have been the result of a gradual cleaning-up of the name; Gropecunt Lane in 13th-century Wells became Grope Lane, and then in the 19th century, Grove Lane. In the city of York, Grapcunt Lane (grāp being the Old English word for "grope") was renamed Grope Lane and is now called Grape Lane.

A similar case was in the town of Sasmuan, Pampanga, in the Philippines, formerly known as "Sexmoan" based on attempts by Spanish friars to transcribe Sasmuan; it was unanimously changed into Sasmuan in 1991 because of negative sexual connotations associated with the place name.

In Canada, the town of Swastika, Ontario, founded in 1908, adopted its name years before the Nazi Party adopted the swastika as a symbol.

In Spain, a municipality was named Castrillo Matajudíos ("Jew-killer Camp") from 1627 to 2015. Matamoros (Moor killer), however, remains a common place name, surname, and even the name of several businesses in Spanish-speaking countries.

A few place names in the United States and Canada historically used the word "nigger", a derogatory term for black people. Over the course of the 20th century, many of these place names were changed because of the racist connotations of the word. One example is Dead Nigger Draw in Texas (named to commemorate the Buffalo Soldier tragedy of 1877), which was changed to Dead Negro Draw in 1963, then to Buffalo Soldier Draw in 2020. Another is Niggerhead Mountain near Malibu, California, which was changed to Negrohead Mountain in the 1960s and finally to Ballard Mountain in 2010 for an early African American settler. Niggertown Marsh and Niggertown Knoll in Highlands County, Florida, named for a short-lived freedmen's settlement from the 1870s, were removed from public maps following a complaint in 1992. In Canada, Quebec decided in 2015 to rename 11 places within the province that contained the word "nigger" or the French equivalent, nègre. An Australian island about 30km north of Cape Grenville was formerly known as Nigger Head; in September 2017 the Queensland government stated that a new name would be chosen for the island, although a new name was never selected and the island remains officially unnamed. In 2016 New Zealand renamed three locations which were found to be offensive, Niggerhead, Nigger Hill, and Nigger Stream.

Likewise, there is pressure to remove the word "squaw" from place names, a traditional term for a Native American woman now considered derogatory. In 2003, Squaw Peak in Phoenix, Arizona, was renamed to Piestewa Peak, after Specialist Lori Ann Piestewa, killed in action during Operation Iraqi Freedom.

Name changes
Sometimes settlement names are changed as a publicity stunt or to promote tourism.

Kindai University in Osaka, Japan, changed its English-language name from Kinki University (pronounced kinky) in 2014, which, in the English language, has a provocative meaning. The Japanese-language name of the university, was left unchanged. The change was globally reported, though since its founding in 1949, the original name was not a problem within Japan.  However, with the dramatic globalization of Japanese universities in recent decades, including the presence of hundreds of foreign students, staff, faculty, and visiting scholars on campus, the leadership of the university made the change in 2016, after deciding to do so in 2014.

Waters, Arkansas, changed its name to Pine Ridge, Arkansas, after it became known that the fictional town Pine Ridge in the radio sitcom Lum and Abner was based on Waters. Now a sparsely populated and no longer incorporated community, Pine Ridge is home to a Lum and Abner museum.

Truth or Consequences, New Mexico, changed its name from Hot Springs in 1950, after the host of the radio program Truth or Consequences promised free publicity to any town willing to change its name to that of the show. Jim Thorpe, Pennsylvania, changed its name from Mauch Chunk in honor of the famous athlete when his widow agreed to allow his remains to be buried there.  The former community of Clark, Texas changed its name to DISH as part of a marketing agreement with Dish Network whereby the town's residents (roughly 200) would get free satellite TV service from the company.

In 1999, the town of Halfway, Oregon, changed its name to Half.com for one year after the e-commerce start-up of the same name offered 20 computers, as well as $110,000 for the school, and other financial subsidies.

Saint Augusta, Minnesota, was for a short time named Ventura after the then-governor Jesse Ventura (whose ring name was in turn named after the city of Ventura, California) to draw attention in avoiding annexation by the nearby city of Saint Cloud. The name was reverted to the original name after the crisis passed.

In the late 1990s, the town of Granville, North Dakota, agreed to change its name temporarily to McGillicuddy City as part of a promotion for Dr. McGillicuddy's schnapps.

In March 2010, Topeka, Kansas, temporarily changed its name to Google, after the technology company, in an attempt to secure the installation of Google Fiber in the city.

Lexically unusual place names

Unorthodox spelling or pronunciation, particularly short or long names, and names derived from unusual sources are often seen as unusual, especially by people outside the culture which named them. The Welsh village of Llanfairpwllgwyngyll changed its name to the longer Llanfairpwllgwyngyll­gogerychwyrndrobwllllanty­siliogogogoch ("The church of [St.] Mary (Llanfair) [of the] pool (pwll) of the white hazels (gwyn gyll) near [lit. "over against"] (go ger) the fierce whirlpool (y chwyrn drobwll) [and] the church of [St.] Tysilio (Llantysilio) of the red cave") in the 1860s for publicity reasons. At 58 letters, it has the longest place name in the UK. The body of fresh water in Webster, Massachusetts, that has historically (since at least 1921) borne the apparently Native American 45-letter/fourteen-syllable name Lake Chargoggagoggmanch­auggagoggchaubunagungamaugg is usually shortened, for instance on road maps, to using only the final six syllables from its "long form"; as Lake Chaubunagungamaug, or even more simply to "Webster Lake". The longest single-word place name in the world is Taumatawhakatangihanga­koauauotamateaturipuka­kapikimaungahoronukupokai­whenuakitanatahu, a hill in New Zealand.

Conversely, there are several settlements whose name consists of only one letter. A number of Norwegian towns are named Å. The name often comes from the Old Norse word Ár, meaning small river. Examples include: Å, Åfjord; Å, Meldal; Å, Lavangen; and Å, Tranøy (also compare rivers named Aa). A village in northern France has been called Y since the 13th century. The Netherlands has IJ (Amsterdam), formerly spelled Y. The Dutch digraph IJ, although typed using two characters, is sometimes considered a ligature, or even a single letter in itself.

There are a number of place names that seem unusual to English speakers because they do not conform to standard English orthography rules. Examples include the Welsh towns of Ysbyty Ystwyth and Bwlchgwyn which appear to English speakers to contain no vowel characters, although y and w represent vowel sounds in Welsh. Aioi, Japan; Eiao, Marquesas Islands; Aiea, Hawaii; Oia, Greece; Oia, Spain; Aia and Ea, Spanish Basque Country; Ae, Scotland; Aa and Ao in Estonia; Eu, France and Ii, Finland, on the other hand, contain only vowels and no consonants. Triples of any letter in English are considered rare; although the French Polynesian commune Fa'a'ā and its airport Faa'a International Airport both appear to contain a triple a, the apostrophe-like ʻetas represent glottal stops in Tahitian.
	
Unusual names may also be created as a result of error by the naming authority. An example is Rednaxela Terrace in Hong Kong, which is believed to be the name Alexander but erroneously written right-to-left (the normal practice for writing Chinese in the past); the name has stayed and even been transcribed back to Chinese phonetically.

Road sign theft

As a result of increased notoriety, road signs are commonly stolen in Fucking, Austria, as souvenirs – the only crime which has been reported in the village. It cost some 300 euros to replace each stolen sign, and the costs were reflected in the taxes that local residents pay. In 2004, owing mainly to the stolen signs, a vote was held on changing the village's name, but the residents voted against doing so. Tarsdorf municipality's mayor Siegfried Höppl stated that it was decided to keep the name as it had existed for 800 years, and further stated that "everyone here knows what it means in English, but for us Fucking is Fucking – and it's going to stay Fucking."
In November 2020, the council of Tarsdorf voted to have the village's name officially changed to Fugging (pronounced the same as Fucking in the dialect spoken in the region), effective 1 January 2021.

In 2010, the inhabitants of Shitterton, Dorset, purchased a 1.5-ton block of Purbeck stone to place at the entrance to Shitterton, carved with the hamlet's name to prevent theft. A truck and crane were hired by volunteers to put the stone in place at a total cost of £680.

See also

List of names in English with counterintuitive pronunciations
List of long place names
List of short place names
Gag name
Toponymy, the study of place names
List of chemical compounds with unusual names
Wikipedia:Unusual place names

Notes

References

External links

University of Calgary press 
CNN news, Odd town names strike author's fancy (1998)
Odd and Unusual Place Names
Topeka, Kansas, named Google, Kansas for one month
List of Weird Place Names
Rude Hong Kong
Britain's silliest place names (The Telegraph)

Place names
Lists of things considered unusual